Professor Catharine Lumby is an Australian academic, author and journalist, currently Chair of the Department of Media and Communication at University of Sydney

Career

Prior to Lumby's move to academia, she was a feature writer and columnist for the Sydney Morning Herald, a news writer for the Australian Broadcasting Corporation and a columnist and senior writer at The Bulletin. She was the foundation Chair of the Media and Communications Department at the University of Sydney (1999-2007) and the foundation Director of the Journalism and Media Research Centre at the University of New South Wales (2008-2013). She joined Macquarie University in 2013 as Professor of Media.

Since 2004 she has been a pro bono gender adviser to the National Rugby League (NRL). In 2017 she almost resigned from the role, stating that she was disappointed by the lack of off-field behaviour change of NRL players towards women and that it highlighted continued disrespect.

In 2013 Lumby was appointed by Tony Burke, Minister for the Arts, to the Council of the National Museum of Australia. She was re-appointed for a further three-year term in May 2016.

Lumby wrote the foreword to End Rape on Campus Australia's report, Connecting the dots: Understanding sexual assault in university communities, submitted to the Australian Human Rights Commission in January 2017.

Lumby is a contributor to The Guardian on gender issues. She is a Member of the Editorial Boards of the International Journal of Cultural Studies and the Feminist Media Studies journal.

Publications

As author
 Bad Girls: The Media, Sex and Feminism in the 90s, Allen & Unwin, 1997, 
 Gotcha: Life in a Tabloid World, Allen & Unwin, 1999, 
 Tim Storrier: The Art of the Outsider, Craftman's House, 2000, 
 Why TV Is Good for Kids: Raising 21st Century Children, co-authored with Duncan Fine, Pan Macmillan, 2006, 
 The Porn Report, co-authored with Alan McKee and Kath Albury, Melbourne University Press, 2008, 
 Alvin Purple, about the 1973 comedy film, Alvin Purple, for the Australian Screen Classic Series,  Currency Press, 2008,

As editor
 Remote Control: New Media, New Ethics, co-edited with Elspeth Probyn, Cambridge University Press, 2003,

As contributor
Lumby has contributed chapters to a number of books, including:
 "Generation Panics: Age, Knowledge and Cultural Power in a New Media Era", in Culture in Australia : Policies, Publics and Programs, edited by Tony Bennett and David Carter, Cambridge University Press, Melbourne, 2001, 
 "The President's Penis : Entertaining Sex and Power", in Our Monica, Ourselves : The Clinton Affair and the National Interest, edited by Lauren Berlant and Lisa Duggan, New York University Press, 2001, 
 "Inside Out: Journalism in the University, Intellectuals in the Media", in Consent and Consensus : Politics, Media and Governance in Twentieth Century Australia, edited by Denis Cryle and Jean Hillier, Australia Research Institute, 2005, 
 "Media Ethics", in The Media and Communications in Australia, edited by Stuart Cunningham and Graeme Turner, Allen & Unwin, 2006, 
 "Past the Post in Feminist Media Studies", in Current Perspectives in Feminist Media Studies, edited by Lisa McLaughlin and Cynthia Carter, Routledge, 2013, 
 "Policing The Crisis Of Masculinity: Media And Masculinity At The Dawn Of The New Century", in The Routledge Companion to Media and Gender, edited by Cynthia Carter, Linda Steiner and Lisa McLaughlin, Routledge, Taylor & Francis Group, 2015,

Awards and honours
 Harkness Fellowship, The Commonwealth Fund, New York, 1994–96
 Presented the 2004 Dymphna Clark Memorial Lecture
 Vice Chancellor’s Senior Leadership Award, University of New South Wales, 2012

References

External links
 Official website
http://www.catharinelumbyassociates.com/

Living people
Year of birth missing (living people)
Australian women journalists
Academic staff of Macquarie University
Gender studies academics